Mongoose OS is an Internet of Things (IoT) Firmware Development Framework available under Apache License Version 2.0. It supports low power, connected microcontrollers such as: ESP32, ESP8266, TI CC3200, TI CC3220, STM32 (STM32L4, STM32F4, STM32F7 series). Its purpose is to be a complete environment for prototyping, development and managing connected devices.

It is designed to reduce the time and costs associated with IoT projects.

Mongoose OS fills a noticeable gap for embedded software developers: the gap between Arduino firmware suitable for prototyping and bare-metal microcontrollers' native SDKs.

It is developed by Cesanta Software Ltd., a company based in Dublin (Ireland) and dual licensed.

Features 
 User friendly Over the Air (OTA) updating of embedded ICs.
 Secure connectivity and crypto support
 Integrated Mongoose Web Server
 Programming in either JavaScript (integrated mJS engine) or C.
 Integration with private and public clouds: AWS IoT, Microsoft Azure IoT, Google IoT Core, IBM Watson IoT, Mosquitto, HiveMQ, etc.

License 
Mongoose OS is Open Source and dual-licensed:
 Mongoose OS Community Edition - Apache License Version 2.0
 Mongoose OS Enterprise Edition - Commercial License

References

External links 

 

Embedded operating systems
Free software operating systems
Internet of things